Tara Beier (née Browne) is a Canadian-American singer-songwriter. Her music has been often described as a blend of folk, alternative, country, and pop.

Early life 
Beier was born in Vancouver, British Columbia. Her father is Filipino and mother is of British, Austrian and Scottish descent.  Her great-grandfather was a working pianist in Victoria, Canada.
 
Throughout her childhood, her family moved three times. She attended three different elementary schools and three different high schools. They lived in a wealthy horse village for a period of time, where she cultivated a love of animals and nature and became an avid equestrian. She would often sleep in barns to get up early to trail ride. She took horseback riding lessons and would muck barns in exchange for lessons. Her parents eventually separated and later reconciled. She describes her childhood as "difficult and at times confusing," and says that this gave her a great sense of independence from a young age.
 
She started playing classical piano at the age of 5. She also tap danced as a child and was an avid equestrian. Beier attended The Royal Conservatory of Music for over 10 years. She had a very strict piano teacher who suffered from alcoholism and Tara would sometimes leave her classes crying and in fear. She persevered for the love of music, and has stated, thankful for the strong foundation in music she received due to this experience.
 
She attended Simon Fraser University, where she earned a BA in Criminology. Her degree granted her an understanding of society and human behavior, and she became an advocate for criminal justice and prison reform. Beier originally planned to go into law before embarking on a career in film and music.
 
Tara has openly admitted she has an unstable relationship with her father. Beier has stated that she spent several years working with a psychotherapist to reconcile with this, as well as other traumas from her childhood, and attributes her sense of identity to songwriting and psychotherapy.

Film career

Film and production
Beier began her career as a theatre actress and wrote poetry as a hobby. She later pursued a career in filmmaking as a producer. She wrote and produced the documentary I Met A Man From Burma, which told the story of Ler Wah Lo Bo, a Burmese refugee and former revolutionary fighter. She then wrote and performed in a native rights film entitled Covered, a docudrama highlighting a CBC 1966 television interview of the legendary folk singer and activist Buffy Sainte-Marie. Beier played the lead role of Buffy Sainte-Marie.

Film festivals and accolades
Her film I Met A Man From Burma was accepted into the Vancouver International Film Festival Reel Causes Program, dedicated to addressing global social justice issues. After sending the Canadian immigration minister a copy of the film, Beier was told that the film's subject Ler Wah Lo Bo would be upgraded from refugee status to full Canadian citizenship. In 2014, Beier's film Covered won the Best Experimental category at the Imaginenative Film Festival in Toronto, and was also accepted into the Toronto International Film Festival, Whistler Film Festival and a number of other international film festivals.

Musical career
Playing the role of Buffy Sainte-Marie inspired Beier to focus on music. In 2016 she released her first album, Hero & The Sage’’ produced by Bret Higgins, the bassist of the Great Lake Swimmers. Songs from the album were well-received and got significant air time on radio stations across Canada and the USA. In 2017, Tara self-produced California 1970, a 6 track EP, at The Village (studio) in Los Angeles, with guitarist Adam Zimmon, drummer Tripp Beam, bassist Eliot Lorango, and keyboardist Sasha Smith. Additional vocals for the EP were recorded at the home studio of Guns N' Roses drummer Matt Sorum in Hollywood.
 
Tara then released a single called “Forgiveness” with Grammy award-winning producer Doug Boehm. She then toured with her band throughout Toronto, Berlin, Los Angeles, San Francisco and New York. The band played at Riverfest in Ontario, Canada alongside MGMT. They have also played at Canadian Music Week, headlined at the Troubadour in West Hollywood, and at the Rockwood Music Hall in New York City.
 
In July 2021, Beier commemorated her twin pregnancy with a semi-nude photoshoot on the cover of life-fashion journal Harpers Bazaar.
 
Her life and music have been discussed in American Songwriter, ET Canada, GQ, the New York Times, Harper Bazaar and NBC news. She has also appeared on the cover of LaPalme Magazine, British Thoughts Magazine and Contrast Magazine, among others.

Biden’s Nurses Campaign
Tara’s song “Hero & The Sage” off her debut album was selected to back President Joe Biden’s Nurses Campaign during the Presidential Inauguration in 2021. The campaign video is of nurses across the United States who pledge to wear masks for 100 days and ask the public to do the same in order to fight Covid-19.

Super Bloom
Tara’s second album “Super Bloom” was produced by three-time Grammy-nominated musician Ken Coomer, (original founding drummer of Wilco and Uncle Tupelo) in Nashville in 2019 and released on Manimal Vinyl Records in 2020, a Los Angeles-based record label that had previously released debut albums for Yoko Ono, Moby, Duran Duran, Bat for Lashes, Edward Sharpe and the Magnetic Zeros, Carla Bruni, Asia Argento and more. Super Bloom album made its premiere on USA Today and Glamour Magazine also took their piece of Tara by including an interview for the premiere of the album single "Hopeless Romantic.”

Discography

Albums
 Hero & The Sage (2016)
 Super Bloom (2020)

Singles & EPs
 California 1970 (2017)
 Forgiveness (2017)
Doctor Brown (2018)
Flying Saucer (2019)
Caged Man (2020) 
Free Yourself (2021)
Do You Hear What I Hear (2021)
Freedom Island' (2022)

Personal life 
While working on a Nivea television commercial, Tara met film producer Dennis Beier. The two married and currently reside in Los Angeles, CA and Joshua Tree, CA and have previously resided in Hamburg, Berlin, and Toronto. They have twin sons, Austin and River, born in 2021.
 
Beier frequently uses social media, especially Instagram, to advocate for reducing plastic waste and preserving the environment.

See also
Angel Olsen
Neko Case
Sharon Van Etten
Laura Marling 
Kyrie Kristmanson

References

 

 

Canadian folk singer-songwriters
Canadian folk guitarists
Canadian women folk guitarists
Canadian activists
Canadian women folk singers
Canadian women singer-songwriters
Living people
Musicians from Vancouver
Year of birth missing (living people)